Amphicarpum (common name maidencane) is a genus of North American plants in the grass family, found only in the eastern United States.

Description
Amphicarpum is mostly found in the Northeast and Southeast United States.  It is usually found in wetlands near rivers and lakes. The grass has two types of flowers, one aerial type and the an underground type which self-fertilizes. 
 Species
 Amphicarpum amphicarpon (Pursh) Nash - MA NJ NY DE FL GA MD NC SC VA
 Amphicarpum muehlenbergianum (Schult.) Hitchc. - AL FL GA NC SC

See also
 List of Poaceae genera

References

External links
 

Panicoideae
Poaceae genera
Endemic flora of the United States